The U.S. state of Rhode Island is home to 27 buildings over  in height.

The Industrial National Bank Building, nicknamed the "Superman Building" due to its resemblance to the fictional Daily Planet building from the 1950s TV series, Adventures of Superman, is also the sixth-tallest building in New England outside of Boston.

As one of the early manufacturing centers in the United States, many of Providence's tallest buildings were constructed prior to 1930; among these are the Industrial National Bank Building, Turk's Head Building, and Bannigan Building. The city went through a second building boom in the 1970s, during which One Financial Plaza and Textron Tower, the city's second and fifth-tallest buildings, were completed. In the 1990s and 2000s, the city again experienced a construction boom. Dubbed the Providence "Renaissance," this period saw the construction of four of the cities ten tallest buildings.



Tallest buildings

This lists ranks Rhode Island structures based on standard height measurement. This includes spires and architectural details but does not include antenna masts. An equal sign (=) following a rank indicates the same height between two or more buildings. The "Year" column indicates the year in which the building was completed.

Tallest proposed

Tallest demolished

Timeline of tallest buildings 
This table lists buildings that once held the title of tallest building in Rhode Island. Since the completion of the First Baptist Church in America, all structures to hold the title have been located in Providence.

Notes

References
General

Specific

External links
Diagram of Providence skyscrapers on SkyscraperPage
Providence structures on Structurae

 
Rhode Island
Tallest in Providence